Robert Swanson may refer to:

Bob Swanson (1912–1940), American race car driver
Robert Swanson (inventor) (1905–1994), Canadian whistle inventor
Robert A. Swanson (1947–1999), American venture capitalist and co-founder of Genentech
Robert H. Swanson, American entrepreneur, co-founder of Linear Technology